Leandro Carvalho is a given name. It may refer to:

 Leandro Carvalho (footballer, born 1983), Brazilian football defensive midfielder
 Leandro Carvalho (footballer, born 1995), Brazilian football forward
 Leandrinho (footballer, born 1996), born Leandro Alves de Carvalho, Brazilian football midfielder